Buell Kazee (August 29, 1900 – August 31, 1976) was an American country and folk singer. He is considered one of the most successful folk musicians of the 1920s and experienced a career comeback during the American folk music revival of the 1960s due in part to his inclusion on the Anthology of American Folk Music.

Early life 
Buell Kazee was born at the foot of Burton Fork, Kentucky, a mountain in Magoffin County. By the age of five, Kazee found publicity playing banjo at church. After he graduated high school, he studied English, Greek and Latin at Georgetown College.

Career
In 1927, Kazee received an inquiry from Brunswick Records, asking if he would consider recording in their studio in New York City. Kazee traveled to New York, and eventually signed with the label. His first record was "Roll On John" backed with "John Hardy". Over the next two years, backed by an assortment of New York musicians, he recorded 51 songs, including such hits as "Gray Lady," "The Sporting Bachelors," and "The Little Orphan Child."  His greatest success was his rendition of "On Top Of Old Smoky".

Kazee's lyrics were often dominated by religious subjects, but also treated everyday problems of the working man. In the early 1930s, he moved to the Vocalion label. As the Depression worsened, Kazee recorded less and less, and eventually left the music business and worked for the next 22 years as the pastor of First Baptist Church in Morehead, Kentucky.

Withdrawal and revival
After the Great Depression in the United States, Kazee performed only rarely and devoted himself entirely to the ministry, the profession that he had actually wanted to pursue since his teens. During the 1960s folk music boom, Kazee began a comeback and started to perform again. He made joint appearances with other former folk stars like Dock Boggs and Clarence Ashley and Doc Watson at the Newport Folk Festival. He also wrote and published three books.

Buell Kazee died on 31 August 1976 at age 76.

Discography

Singles

Albums

External links 
 Buell Kazee at Hillbilly Music.com
 Biography at CMT.com
 The Butcher's Boy and The Dying Soldier Download (MP3-Format)

1900 births
1976 deaths
American country singer-songwriters
American folk singers
Folk musicians from Kentucky
Georgetown College (Kentucky) alumni
People from Magoffin County, Kentucky
People from Morehead, Kentucky
20th-century American singers
Country musicians from Kentucky
Singer-songwriters from Kentucky
American banjoists